Wilfrido Antonio Vinces (born December 5, 1983) is an Ecuadorian footballer currently playing for Técnico Universitario in the Serie A de Ecuador.

External links

1983 births
Living people
Association football forwards
Ecuadorian footballers
S.D. Quito footballers
C.D. Olmedo footballers
Manta F.C. footballers
L.D.U. Portoviejo footballers
C.D. Técnico Universitario footballers